HM Prison Cookham Wood is a male young person's' prison and Young Offenders Institution in the village of Borstal (near Rochester) in Kent, England. The prison is operated by His Majesty's Prison and probation Service.

History
The prison was built in 1978, next to HMP Rochester and was named Cookham Wood Young Offenders Institution. The new prison was originally for young men, but its use was changed to meet the growing need for secure female accommodation at the time.

In 1998 the prison started accepting female juvenile offenders (aged 12–14), and was refurbished for that purpose. The costs involved with the refurbishment and the new facilities provided at the prison led to the media branding Cookham Wood "Britain's most controversial jail".

In a 2003 report the Prison Reform Trust criticised Cookham Wood for being one of the most overcrowded women's prison in the UK. The report also highlighted serious drug misuse amongst inmates at the prison. However, a 2005 report by His Majesty's Chief Inspector of Prisons commended the prison for improving standards.

In 2007 the Prison Service announced that Cookham Wood would be converted to accept male young offenders. This was due to increased demand for places in men's prisons in the UK. Cookham Wood formally started taking male prisoners during 2008.

The prison today
Cookham Wood is a Young Persons establishment, holding males aged 15 to 18. Accommodation at the prison consists of single occupancy cells.

All young people have access to showers, and 45 minutes outside in the open air every day. The prison operates a resettlement programme for young people coming to the end of their sentences, and has links to community groups and employers.

Notable former inmates
 Myra Hindley
 Judy Carne
 Sandra Gregory

References

External links
 Ministry of Justice pages on Cookham Wood
 HMYOI Cookham Wood - HM Inspectorate of Prisons Reports

Cookham
Cookham Wood
Cookham Wood
1978 establishments in England